Brachynarthron aeneipennis is a species of beetle in the family Cerambycidae. It was described by Stephan von Breuning in 1956. It is known from Ghana.

References

Endemic fauna of Ghana
Protonarthrini
Beetles described in 1956